Roxanna Panufnik (born 24 April 1968) is a British composer of Polish heritage. She is the daughter of the composer and conductor Sir Andrzej Panufnik and his second wife Camilla, née Jessel.

Panufnik was born in London. She attended Bedales School and then studied at the Royal Academy of Music. She has written a wide range of pieces including opera, ballet, music theatre, choral works, chamber compositions and music for film and television, which are regularly performed all over the world.

Among her most widely performed works are Westminster Mass, commissioned for Westminster Cathedral Choir on the occasion of Cardinal Hume's 75th birthday in May 1998, The Music Programme, an opera for Polish National Opera's millennium season which received its UK premiere at the BOC Covent Garden Festival, and settings for solo voices and orchestra of Vikram Seth's Beastly Tales – the first of which was commissioned by the BBC for Patricia Rozario and City of London Sinfonia. All three Tales are available on disc.

Panufnik has a particular interest in world music; a recent culmination of this was Abraham, a violin concerto commissioned by Savannah Music Festival for Daniel Hope, incorporating Christian, Islamic and Jewish music. This was then converted into an overture, commissioned by the World Orchestra for Peace and premiered in Jerusalem under the baton of Valery Gergiev.

Recently premiered was her oratorio Dance of Life (in Latin and Estonian), incorporating her fourth mass setting, for multiple Tallinn choirs and the Tallinn Philharmonic Orchestra (commissioned to mark their tenure of European Capital of Culture 2011). Her Four World Seasons for violinist Tasmin Little was premiered with the London Mozart Players and broadcast live on BBC Radio 3 on 2 March 2012, as part of BBC Radio 3's Music Nation, celebrating the 2012 Olympics.

The Bristol-based Exultate Singers, under their founder-conductor David Ogden, gave the premiere of Panufnik's Magnificat and Nunc Dimittis for the London Festival of Contemporary Church Music in 2012. Of the Magnificat, Panufnik said: 

Garsington Opera commissioned Panufnik's people's opera  Silver Birch and gave the world premiere on 28 July 2017. With a libretto by writer Jessica Duchen this celebration of music, drama, poetry and dance brought together 180 performers on the stage and in the pit, from local schools and the community, working alongside professional soloists, Pinewood Group and the Garsington Opera Orchestra. Karen Gillingham, Creative Director of Garsington Opera's Learning & Participation Programme directed and Douglas Boyd, Garsington Opera's Artistic Director, conducted. Inspired by the timeless themes of war and relationships affected by it, the opera draws upon Siegfried Sassoon's poems and the testimony of a British soldier, who served recently in Iraq, to illustrate the human tragedies of conflicts past and present.

Panufnik was the inaugural Associate Composer with the London Mozart Players, 2012–2015.

She is a Vice-President of the Joyful Company of Singers. In 2023, Panufnik was announced as one of the composers who would each create a brand new piece for the Coronation of Charles III and Camilla.

Selected works
 Westminster Mass (1997), commissioned for Cardinal Basil Hume's 75th birthday, performed in May 1998 at Westminster Cathedral
 Powers & Dominions (2001), a concertino for harp and orchestra
 Inkle and Yarico (1996), a reconstruction of an anti-slavery play of the 18th century
 The Music Programme (1999), a chamber opera commissioned by Polish National Opera (based on a novel by Paul Micou)
 Beastly Tales (2001/2), for soprano and orchestra
 I Dream'd, one of nine choral pieces forming A Garland for Linda in memory of Linda McCartney
 The Upside Down Sailor, a collaboration with Richard Stilgoe
 Spirit Moves, a quintet for the Fine Arts Brass Ensemble
 Private Joe, a work for baritone Nigel Cliffe and the Schidlof String Quartet
 Odi et Amo, a ballet for London Musici and the Rambert Dance Company
 Olivia, a string quartet for the Maggini Quartet, with optional children's choir
 Love Abide (2006), a piece for choir, mezzo-soprano, organ, harp and strings commissioned by the Choral Arts Society of Philadelphia for its 25th anniversary
 Wild Ways (2008), a piece for choir, and shakuhachi commissioned by the Nonsuch Singers and Kiku Day
 So Strong Is His Love (2008) a piece for choir and quartet commissioned by the Waltham Singers for the 25th Anniversary of their conductor, Andrew Fardell
 All Shall Be Well (2009), an Advent carol commissioned by Exultate Singers for the 20th anniversary of the Fall of the Berlin Wall
 The Call (2010), an Advent carol commissioned by St John's College, Cambridge
 Magnificat (2012), a piece for choir commissioned by Exultate Singers
 Nunc Dimittis (2012), a piece for choir commissioned by Exultate Singers
 The Song of Names (2012), a piece for choir and chamber orchestra commissioned by The Portsmouth Grammar School for Remembrance Day
 Silver Birch (2017), a people's opera commissioned by Garsington Opera
 A Cradle Song (2017), a piece for choir and organ commissioned by the Royal Choral Society
 Faithful Journey, a Mass for Poland (2018, fp. Katowice, 9/11/18)

References

External links

 Genesis Foundation Panufnik texts page, accessed 3 February 2010
 Guardian review (10 November 2009), accessed 3 February 2010
 Orchestra of the Swan biography, accessed 3 February 2010
 More information about Silver Birch
 Royal Choral Society

1968 births
Living people
Alumni of the Royal Academy of Music
British people of Polish descent
20th-century classical composers
21st-century classical composers
21st-century British composers
British women classical composers
Musicians from London
20th-century English composers
People educated at Bedales School
20th-century English women musicians
21st-century English women musicians
20th-century women composers
21st-century women composers